The Little Kyll , pronounced: "kill") is a  orographically right-hand tributary of the Lieser.

Geography

Course 
It flows in a southerly direction through the municipalities of Neroth, Oberstadtfeld, Niederstadtfeld and Schutz and empties into the Lieser south of Manderscheid, Bernkastel-Wittlich.

Tributaries 
The tributaries of the Little Kyll include the following (in a downstream direction):

Recreation 
In the area between Oberstadtfeld and Bleckhausener Mühle/Meerfeld the cycleway  runs parallel to the Kleine Kyll.

At the confluence with the Horngraben, south of Manderscheid is the gorge of Wolfsschlucht as well as a waterfall.

See also 
List of rivers of Rhineland-Palatinate

References

External links 

Rivers of the Eifel
Waterfalls of Germany
Rivers of Rhineland-Palatinate
Vulkaneifel
Bernkastel-Wittlich
Rivers of Germany